The City Clerk of Chicago is in charge of record-keeping for Chicago, including for its elections, permits, licenses, and laws. When the Chicago City Council is in session, the City Clerk also serves as council secretary. The clerk is a citywide elected office, and is one of three city-wide elected officials in the City of Chicago, along with the Mayor and the Treasurer.

The current city clerk is Anna Valencia.

Duties 

The City Clerk's office is responsible for maintaining official city government record (such as the Municipal Code of Chicago), distributing approximately 1.3 million vehicle stickers and residential parking permits, and issuing city business licenses.

Significant City Council transparency efforts have included posting nearly 700,000 pages of searchable City Council records to the City Clerk website, ChiCityClerk.com.  This includes every ordinance passed since 1981, as well as city budgets and mayoral executive orders going back nearly 30 years. In addition, City Council meetings can be watched live or on demand via a City Council video archive on the City Clerk's website.

List of City Clerks

Town Clerks
The position of City Clerk was preceded by the position of Town Clerk, which existed after Chicago had been incorporated as a town and before Chicago was incorporated as a city.

References

External links
Office of the City Clerk
 

City and town clerks
City Clerk
1837 establishments in Illinois